In algebraic geometry, a complex algebraic variety is an algebraic variety (in the scheme sense or otherwise) over the field of complex numbers.

Chow's theorem

Chow's theorem states that a projective analytic variety; i.e., a closed analytic subvariety of the complex projective space  is an algebraic variety; it is usually simply referred to as a projective variety.

Relation with similar concepts
Not every complex analytic variety is algebraic, though.

See also 

 Complex analytic variety

References

Algebraic varieties